Neukirchen am Walde is a municipality in the district of Grieskirchen in the Austrian state of Upper Austria.

Geography
Neukirchen lies in the Hausruckviertel. About 21 percent of the municipality is forest, and 70 percent is farmland.

References

Cities and towns in Grieskirchen District